Rare & Unreleased Recordings from the Golden Reign of the Queen of Soul is a 2007 two-disc compilation album featuring unreleased and rare songs by Aretha Franklin recorded between 1966 and 1973 on Atlantic Records. The liner notes, nominated for a Grammy at the 51st Annual Grammy Awards, were co-written by Jerry Wexler, who was responsible for producing the sound which solidified Franklin as a legend, and David Ritz, who co-authored Franklin's 1999 autobiography.

Track listing
Disc one, tracks 10, 14 and 18, and disc two, track 1, previously released.

Charts

References

External links
Discogs - Rare & Unreleased Recordings from the Golden Reign of the Queen of Soul images 2CD reMastered 2007-October-16th Rhino Records (8122-79970-3) UK&Europe
 "I Never Loved a Man (The Way I Love You)" at ghostarchive.org

Aretha Franklin compilation albums
2007 compilation albums